John Emery Kerns (June 17, 1923 – June 7, 1988) was a Canadian football player who played for the Toronto Argonauts. He won the Grey Cup with them in 1950. He played college football at Ohio University and also played with the Buffalo Bills of the All-America Football Conference. He died in 1988 on his 65th birthday while playing tennis, of a heart attack.

References

1923 births
1988 deaths
Sportspeople from Ashtabula, Ohio
Players of American football from Ohio
American football tackles
Ohio Bobcats football players
Buffalo Bills (AAFC) players
American players of Canadian football
Canadian football tackles
Toronto Argonauts players